Events from the year 1953 in South Korea.

Incumbents
President: Rhee Syng-man 
Vice President: Ham Tae-young
Prime Minister: Paik Too-chin (until 24 April), Paik Too-chin (starting 24 April)

Events
 9 January – According to South Korea's Coast Guard official confirmed report, a passenger ferry Changgyeong-ho capsized off the coast of Busan, and 229 persons perished.
 1 August – Cheil Jedang (now CJ CheilJedang), a food manufacturer, was founded.
 The Korea Herald newspaper was founded.
 1 October – The Mutual Defense Treaty (United States–South Korea) was signed,

Births

 18 January - Chon Song-Cha.
 22 January - Myung-whun Chung, Korean conductor and pianist
 24 January - Moon Jae-in.
 29 January - Hwang Woo-suk.
 25 February -Kim Yeong-cheol, South Korean actor
 10 March - Cho Hun-hyun. Go (game) player.
 5 April - Tae Jin-ah, South Korean singer
 22 May - Cha Bum-kun.
 28 May - Moon Sung-keun, Korean actor
 27 July - Chung Dong-young, Korean politician
 18 August - Bae Cheol-soo, Korean musician and radio host
 28 October - Park Yeong-gyu, Korean actor
 13 December - Dokgo Young-jae, Korean actor

Death
 17 April - Yi Si-yeong, Korean independence activist

See also
 List of South Korean films of 1953
 Years in Japan
 Years in North Korea

References

 
South Korea
Years of the 20th century in South Korea
1950s in South Korea
South Korea